Walter North is an American diplomat. He served as the United States Ambassador to Papua New Guinea, Solomon Islands and Vanuatu between 2012 and 2016 . He began his service as Ambassador on November 7, 2012.

Early life and education
North grew up in Mount Hermon, Massachusetts. In 1972 he received a BA in Theatre-Drama at Lawrence University in Appleton, Wisconsin. He graduated from the George Washington University Law School with a J.D.  In 1990 he earned an MPA at Harvard University's Kennedy School of Government.

Career
North joined the Peace Corps after college graduation and served as a volunteer in Ethiopia for two years. He worked in Bonga and Addis Ababa. He also served as a project manager in India and Bangladesh for CARE International, a humanitarian non-profit.

North joined USAID in 1980 and held a variety of roles in that organization before becoming confirmed as a U.S. ambassador. Between 1992 and 2004, he held several assignments outside the U.S., including ones in Addis Ababa, Ethiopia, Lusaka, Zambia and in  New Delhi, India.

Personal
North is married to Dr. Judy Ryon, and they have two children.

References

External links

|-

|-

1950 births
Ambassadors of the United States to Papua New Guinea
Ambassadors of the United States to the Solomon Islands
Ambassadors of the United States to Vanuatu
Harvard Kennedy School alumni
Living people
United States Department of State officials
George Washington University Law School alumni
Lawrence University alumni
21st-century American diplomats